Jailene Maldonado (born 15 February 1995) is a Puerto Rican handball player who plays for the club Fraikin Granollers. She is member of the Puerto Rican national team. She competed at the 2015 World Women's Handball Championship in Denmark.

References

1995 births
Living people
Puerto Rican female handball players
Handball players at the 2011 Pan American Games
Handball players at the 2015 Pan American Games
Handball players at the 2019 Pan American Games
Pan American Games competitors for Puerto Rico
People from Santa Isabel, Puerto Rico
Central American and Caribbean Games silver medalists for Puerto Rico
Competitors at the 2018 Central American and Caribbean Games
Central American and Caribbean Games medalists in handball
21st-century Puerto Rican women